John Blanchard (September 30, 1787 – March 9, 1849) was a Whig member of the U.S. House of Representatives from Pennsylvania.

John Blanchard was born in Peacham, Vermont.  He taught school, and graduated from Dartmouth College in Hanover, New Hampshire, in 1812.  He moved to Pennsylvania in 1812 and settled in York, Pennsylvania, where he again taught school.  He studied law, was admitted to the bar March 31, 1815, and commenced practice in Lewistown, Pennsylvania.  He moved to Bellefonte, Pennsylvania, the same year and continued the practice of law. He owned slaves.

Blanchard was elected as a Whig to the Twenty-ninth and Thirtieth Congresses.  He was not a candidate for renomination in 1848.  He died in Columbia, Pennsylvania, en route from Washington, D.C., to his home in 1849.  Interment in Union Cemetery in Bellefonte.

His son Edmund Blanchard became a prominent businessman in Bellefonte.

References

Sources

The Political Graveyard

1787 births
1849 deaths
People from Peacham, Vermont
American people of English descent
Whig Party members of the United States House of Representatives from Pennsylvania
Pennsylvania lawyers
American slave owners
19th-century American lawyers
Dartmouth College alumni